The Producers Guild of America Award for Best Theatrical Motion Picture, also known as the Darryl F. Zanuck Award for Outstanding Producer of Theatrical Motion Pictures, is one of the annual awards given by the Producers Guild of America from 1989.

Winners and nominees

1980s

1990s

2000s

2010s

2020s

Multiple nominations and wins

Notes
 Since the inception of the Producers Guild of America Award for Best Theatrical Motion Picture, four animated films have been nominated:
 2001 Shrek (lost to Moulin Rouge!)
 2004 The Incredibles (lost to The Aviator)
 2009 Up (lost to The Hurt Locker)
 2010 Toy Story 3 (lost to The King's Speech)

References

Theatrical Motion Picture
Awards for best film